Don Freeland (March 25, 1925 – November 2, 2007) was an American racecar driver who is best known for competing in the Indianapolis 500 eight times.

Born in Los Angeles, California, Freeland served in the Navy as a mechanic during World War II.  After the war, he began racing.  He raced in the AAA and USAC Championship Car series from 1952 to 1962, with 76 career starts.  He finished in the top ten 41 times, with a best finish of second place occurring 3 times.

Freeland competed in the Indy 500 each year from 1953 to 1960.  He appeared headed for a second-place finish in 1955 before a transmission failure ended his day 22 laps prior to the end of the race.  He came back with a best Indy finish of third the next year.  He also finished in the top ten in 1954 and 1958.

Freeland died in San Diego, California at age 82.

Complete AAA/USAC Championship Car results

Indy 500 results

World Championship career summary
The Indianapolis 500 was part of the FIA World Championship from 1950 through 1960. Drivers competing at Indy during those years were credited with World Championship points and participation. Don Freeland participated in 8 World Championship races. He started on the pole 0 times, won 0 races, set 0 fastest laps, and finished on the podium 1 times. He accumulated a total of 4 championship points.

1925 births
2007 deaths
Indianapolis 500 drivers
Racing drivers from San Diego
AAA Championship Car drivers